Narimanov (masculine) or Narimanova (feminine or masculine genitive) may refer to:

People
Nariman Narimanov (1870–1925), Azerbaijani revolutionary, writer, and statesman
Nikolai Narimanov (b. 1958), Soviet hockey player

Places
Nərimanov raion, a city district of Baku, Azerbaijan
Nərimanov, municipality in Saatly Rayon, Azerbaijan
Narimanov, former name of Nərimanabad, a village in Lankaran District of Azerbaijan
Narimanov Urban Settlement, a municipal formation which the town of district significance of Narimanov in Narimanovsky District of Astrakhan Oblast, Russia is incorporated as
Narimanov, Russia (Narimanova), several inhabited localities in Russia

See also
Narimanovsky (disambiguation)
Nariman bey Narimanbeyov, Azerbaijani lawyer and statesman
Promysel Narimanova, a village in Azerbaijan
Narimanovo Airport